Christof Schwaller (born 3 October 1966) is a Swiss curler and Olympic medalist. He received a bronze medal at the 2002 Winter Olympics in Salt Lake City.

He played for the Swiss team at the 1998 (as skip), 2001 (as skip) and 2005 world championships, with the silver medal in 2001 as the best achievement.   He also won an Olympic bronze medal at the 2002 Winter Olympics.

He was skip for the Swiss team that reached the bronze final at the 1988 World Junior Curling Championships in Füssen (finishing fourth).

His brother is Andreas Schwaller.

Teammates 
2002 Salt Lake City Olympic Games

Andreas Schwaller, Skip

Markus Eggler, Second

Damian Grichting, Lead

Marco Ramstein, Alternate

References

External links
 

1966 births
Living people
Olympic curlers of Switzerland
Curlers at the 2002 Winter Olympics
Olympic bronze medalists for Switzerland
Swiss male curlers
Olympic medalists in curling
Medalists at the 2002 Winter Olympics
Swiss curling champions
21st-century Swiss people